Robert Say D.D. (died 24 November 1691) was an English academic administrator at the University of Oxford.

Elected Provost (head) of Oriel College, Oxford on 23 March 1653, he held the post until his death in 1691.  While Provost, Say was Vice-Chancellor of Oxford University from 1664 until 1666.

References

Year of birth missing
1691 deaths
Provosts of Oriel College, Oxford
Vice-Chancellors of the University of Oxford